XHIT-TDT is a TV Azteca television station in Chihuahua, Chihuahua, Mexico. XHIT carries TV Azteca's Azteca Uno with a one-hour delay.

History
XHIT was founded in 1968 on channel 4 as a station of Tele-Cadena Mexicana, which also owned XHCH-TV channel 2; original concessionaire Televisora de Chihuahua merged with the concessionaire for XHCH in 1970. However, the station went off the air in December 1972. On August 8, 1973, a decree was published in the Diario Oficial de la Federación ordering the station to be put out for bid again, stating that XHIT going off the air "deprives a sector of the population of the right it has to receive the station's cultural, civic and entertainment programming". The concession wound up in the hands of Corporación Mexicana de Radio y Televisión — the government's Canal 13 — when it was quickly put out for bid again the following month. Four other bidders attempted to acquire the station, including Francisco Galindo Romero, the founder of Televisa-affiliated XHL-TV in León, Guanajuato.

During the Canal 13 and Imevisión era, XHIT was the only Canal 13 rebroadcaster in the market, as XHCH was tied to the XHGC network for years, and Imevisión operated XHCH as a separate local station. Upon taking control, Azteca changed both XHCH and XHIT to rebroadcast Azteca Uno, though XHIT broadcasts it with a one-hour delay.

Digital television
XHIT-TDT broadcasts on RF channel 23 (virtual channel 1). Two channel 1 stations appear for viewers of XHIT and XHCH.

Until standardization of virtual channels in October 2016, XHIT broadcast on virtual channel 4.

Digital subchannels

Repeaters
XHIT has three repeaters:

|-

|-

|}

References

Azteca Uno transmitters
Television channels and stations established in 1968
Mass media in Chihuahua City